is a Japanese singer and voice actor
who released the two popular singles "Soshite Omae ni Deaeta Dake De" and "Muteki na Smile". Naozumi's single "Ashita No Kioku" was used as an opening theme for Black Blood Brothers.

Filmography

Anime 
 Kamikaze Kaito Jeanne (1999) as Minazuki Yamato
 Ojamajo Doremi (1999) as Takurou
 Digimon Adventure 02 (2000) as Wormmon, Minomon Mantaro Inoue, Operator
 Ashita no Nadja (2003) as Fernando
 Futari wa Pretty Cure (2004) as Ryota Misumi
 Konjiki no Gash Bell!! (2005) as Momon
 C (2011) as Ichiro Horii
 Scared Rider Xechs (2016) as Duesenberg
 Marginal#4: Kiss kara Tsukuru Big Bang (2017) as Rui Aiba
 Nanbaka (2017) as Ruka Gojou

Unknown date
 The Prince of Tennis (????) as Bunta Marui
 Harukanaru Toki no Naka de 1, 2, & 3 as Inori, Isato, & Hinoe respectively

OVA 
 Growlanser (2005) as Crevaniel

Video games 
 Harukanaru Toki no Naka de 1 as Inori
 Harukanaru Toki no Naka de 2 as Isato
 Harukanaru Toki no Naka de 3 as Hinoe
 Harukanaru Toki no Naka de 4 as Toya
 WebKare as Aiba Shun
 Super Robot Wars GC as Akimi Akatsuki
 Super Robot Wars XO as Akimi Akatsuki
 12Riven as Omega Inose
 Gekka Ryouran Romance as Kano Atsumori
 MARGINAL#4 IDOL OF SUPERNOVA as Aiba Rui
 ALICE=ALICE [Cheshire cat]
 8 bit lovers [Slime]
 Crimson Clan as Hu Shixiao

Voice actor on drama CDs
 Michael on Angel Sanctuary
 Coud in Elemental Gelade
 Nitta Kazuto in Dr. Hayami - Super Stylish Doctors Story (SSDS): Ai no Kaitai Shinshou, with Show Hayami, Hiyama Nobuyuki, Morikawa Toshiyuki, Seki Toshihiko, and other voice actors.
Shinsengumi M/K Wasurenagusa (as Saitou Hajime)
Seventh Heaven (as Itsuki)ALICE=ALICE (as the Cheshire Cat)Bad Medicine -Infectious Teachers-' (as Kazuha Kakeru)Oz to Himitsu no Ai (The fourth key: Shian )MARGINAL#4 (as Aiba Rui)Soubou Sangokushi (as Kakou Ton Xiahou Dun)Midnight Jiang Shis (as Rinrin)Exit Tunes Presents ACTORS franchise'' (as Shido Minori)

Discography

Albums and Singles with Koei Music 

~ Kiss You ~ EP : "Kiss You" / Alive / Stay / Kiss You Additional Private Session 2000 (Released 3/21/2002)
Rainy Day / Skylight no Sora (Released 10/23/2002)
A to Z (Released 12/11/2002)
Kimi ni Aete Yokatta (Released 7/23/2003)

Albums with Realize Records 

INDICATE (Released 5/26/2004)
scene ~Nokoshitai Fuukei~ (Released 8/5/2005)
ism (Released 6/2/2006)
one (Released 11/28/2007)
ColorS [Standard and Special Editions] (Released 7/7/2009)
infinity (Released 8/18/2010)
MA-X (Released 9/28/2010)
PLUS+ (Released 12/19/2012)
Voice Rendezvous  (Released 6/11/2014)
Juicys (Released 2/22/2017)
amorous (Released 7/18/2018)

Singles with Realize Records 

Keep on Dancin' (Released 4/21/2004)
Itooshikute (Released 8/18/2004)
hEAVEN (Promotion for h.Naoto - Released 11/26/2005)
OK! (Released 3/24/2006)
Gold Goal (Released 7/7/2006)
Muteki na Smike (Released 8/9/2006)
Ashita no Kioku (Released 10/25/2006)
Te no Hira / Kimi to... (Released 6/20/2007)
PE∀CE (Released 7/18/2007)
Kaze ni Natte / Moshimo... (Released 2/6/2008)
Palette [Standard and Limited Editions] (Released 9/24/2008)
Time Capsule / Aruite Kaerou [Standard and Limited Editions] (Released 2/25/2009)
Rashinban [Standard and Limited Editions] (Released 2/10/2010)
Yumekibo Ressha [Standard and Limited Editions] (Released 12/8/2010)
one on one [Standard and Limited Editions] (Released 8/25/2011)
Taisetsu na Kimi (Released 2/1/2012)
Karakuru / Subuta ni Pineapple ~Shakai Ninben (Released 2/8/2013)
Fuurai Boukyou / Boueikyou (Released 9/17/2014)
PON PON KING / BLUE [Standard and Limited Editions] (Released 1/13/2016)
TRICK / AGAIN [Standard and Limited Editions] (Released 1/13/2016)
MOB / MayQ [Standard and Limited Editions] (Released 1/13/2016)
AXIS / GOBU/GOBU [Standard and Limited Editions] (Released 1/13/2016)

Compilation albums 

Decade Gold -Naozumi Takahashi 10th Anniversary BEST- (Released 10/10/2012)
Decade Silver -Naozumi Takahashi 10th Anniversary BEST- (Released 10/10/2012)

References

External links 
 
 Naozumi Takahashi at GamePlaza-Haruka Voice Acting Database 
 Naozumi Takahashi at Hitoshi Doi's Seiyuu Database
Official Homepage

Japanese male voice actors
1971 births
Living people
Male voice actors from Iwate Prefecture
Musicians from Iwate Prefecture
People from Ōshū, Iwate
21st-century Japanese singers
21st-century Japanese male singers